Harmon School of S.D.A. is one of six Seventh-day Adventist high schools in Trinidad and Tobago and the only one on the island of Tobago. Established in 1952, it was named after the founder of the Seventh-day Adventist Church, Ellen G. White's maiden name, Harmon.  In 2014, Tobago's highest S.E.A topper 11-year-old, Jevaughn Bruce made it his choice of secondary education.

References

Secondary schools in Trinidad and Tobago
Educational institutions established in 1952
1952 establishments in the British Empire